The Broken Cross is a 1916 American silent short romantic film directed by Thomas Ricketts starring Harold Lockwood and May Allison.

Cast
Harold Lockwood
May Allison
Queenie Rosson
Harry von Meter

External links

1910s romance films
1916 films
American romance films
American silent short films
American black-and-white films
Films directed by Tom Ricketts
1910s American films
1910s English-language films